Timo-Pekka Heikkinen (born March 21, 1985) is a Finnish professional ice hockey player. He is currently playing for PYRY of the Finnish Suomi-sarja.

Heikkinen made his Liiga debut playing with JYP during the 2008-09 Liiga season.

References

External links

1985 births
Living people
FoPS players
JYP Jyväskylä players
Lempäälän Kisa players
KooKoo players
Finnish ice hockey forwards
Sportspeople from Jyväskylä
21st-century Finnish people